A list of notable Bulgarian journalists:

Maxim Behar
Oggy Boytchev 
Velizar Enchev
Deyan Enev
Valentin Fortunov
Ivo Indzhev
Nadezhda Kehayova
Nikolay Kolev
Doncho Papazov
Gerri Peev
Plamen Petrov
Petko Bocharov
Frank Satire
Volen Siderov
Stefan Tafrov
Milen Tsvetkov
Ralitsa Vassileva
Elena Yoncheva

References

External links 
 

 
Journalists
Bulgarian